Palos is a 2008 Philippine television drama action series the series is loosely based on the classic Filipino comics and film character of the same name Palos, starring Cesar Montano and Jake Cuenca. The series debuted on ABS-CBN's Primetime Bida evening block from January 28, 2008, to April 25, 2008, replacing Ysabella and was replaced by  Maligno.

The series is streaming online on YouTube.

Origins

Comics

Alyas Palos (Alias Eel) is a comic serial novel by Virgilio and Nestor Redondo, which was first serialized in Tagalog Klasiks in 1961. The title character was a thief and a kind-hearted felon with exceptional safe-cracking skills.

Premise
The story begins when Giancarlo is orphaned at a young age when his mother, Grazella, is killed in a shooting incident in Macau. He blames his mother's death on an agent known only as "Palos", and vows to do whatever it takes to avenge her death.

Cast and characters

Lead cast

Protagonist
 Cesar Montano as Fabio Cassimir / Palos
 Jake Cuenca as Giancarlo Caranzo / New Palos

Antagonist
 Jomari Yllana as Neptune Director Alessandro Canavarro
 Jodi Sta. Maria-Lacson as Carmela Canavarro

Main cast
 Roxanne Guinoo as Anna
 Bangs Garcia as Sylvia Nazi
 Wendy Valdez as Nicolla
 Jay-R Siaboc as Enzo Picaso
 Carla Humphries as Dr. Stella Guidotti
 Regine Angeles as Paola Durante
 Ron Morales as Aldo Mussolini
 Redford White as Mario
 Dennis Padilla as Luigi
 Vandolph Quizon as Giuseppe
 Julia Barretto as Pamela Kiev
 Gloria Romero as Alfonsina Riviera

Supporting and guest cast
 Sunshine Cruz as Grazella R. Caranzo
 Bernard Bonnin as Gen. Vittorio Canavarro
 Albert Martinez as Salvatore
 Al Tantay as Ernesto Mario
 Ricardo Cepeda
 Desiree Del Valle as Arianna Kiev
 Allan Paule
 Lovely Rivero
 Ping Medina
 Joshua Dionisio as Young Giancarlo
 Mariel Rodriguez as Viola
 Epi Quizon as Marco Ferreli
 Charles Christianson
 Emilio Garcia
 Helga Krapf
 Aiko Melendez as Cong. Soledad Canavarro
 Railey Valeroso as Pietro Avelino
 Butz Aquino as President Donatello Guidotti
 Ramon Christopher as Antonino Morato
 Michael Conan as Ivan Kiev
 Timothy Lambert Chan as Franco Canavarro
 JB Magsaysay as Dr. Samuel Chan
 Mico Palanca as Kim Yung Joo
 AJ Dee as Watashi Kim
 Bruce Quebral as Luciano
 Riza Santos as Lady Simona
 Christian Vasquez as Young General Vittorio Canavarro
 John Manalo as Young Fabio
 Marlo Sanchez
 Joem Mercurio
 CJ Jaravata
 Janelle So
 Mike Magat
 Angeli Gonzales as Young Anna
 Rheena Villamor as herself

See also

 List of shows previously aired by ABS-CBN

References

External links
 

ABS-CBN drama series
2008 Philippine television series debuts
2008 Philippine television series endings
Philippine action television series
Television series by Dreamscape Entertainment Television
Filipino-language television shows
Television shows set in the Philippines